Grantwood may refer to:

Grantwood Village, Missouri
Grantwood, New Jersey